Bhaksi is a village in Kamsaar in the Indian state of Uttar Pradesh. As of 2011 census the main population of the village lived in an area of   27.2 acres and had 426 households.

Histrorical Population

References 

Dildarnagar
Dildarnagar Fatehpur
Cities and towns in Ghazipur district
Towns and villages in Kamsar
Villages in Ghazipur district